This is a list of Mongol states. The Mongols founded many states such as the vast Mongol Empire and other states. The list of states is chronological but follows the development of different dynasties.

Pre-modern states

Modern states

Autonomous areas

In Russia

In China

See also

History of Mongolia
List of heads of state of Mongolia
List of Mongol rulers
Timeline of Mongolian history

Maps

References

Bibliography
 
 
 
Weiers, Michael (ed.) (1986): Die Mongolen. Darmstadt: Wissenschaftliche Buchgesellschaft.
Dughlát Muhammad Haidar, Norbert Elias, Edward Denison Ross – The Tarikh-i-rashidi
Henry Hoyle Howorth-History of the Mongols
Herbert Franke, Denis Twitchett, John King Fairbank -The Cambridge History of China: Alien regimes and border states, 907–1368
William Bayne Fisher, Peter Jackson, Laurence Lockhart, J. A. Boyle -The Cambridge history of Iran, 5
Konstantin Nikolaevich Maksimov – Kalmykia in Russia's past and present national policies and administrative system

 
.
.
Mongol states
Mongol states
States
Mongol states
Mongol